Elley Frances Duhé (born February 14, 1992) is an American singer. Born in Mobile, Alabama, she is best known for her 2018 single "Happy Now" with Zedd, which was certified platinum in the United States, and her 2020 single "Middle of the Night" which became viral on TikTok in 2022.

Biography
After her father got Elley her first guitar when she was 14, she began her career at 15 singing in coffee shops. Duhé felt inspired by her musician father and uncles who are in the New Orleans music scene. Graduating to paying gigs in bars, restaurants, and at private parties, she gained enough exposure to be booked to open for national acts and connect with songwriters in Nashville, Los Angeles, and Austin, where, after dropping out of high school and getting her GED, she spent three years honing her craft. She appeared in the blind audition stage of the second season of The Voice in 2012, but did not advance in the competition. Early in her career she used the stage name 'L.E.D.' She currently lives in Los Angeles.

The single "Millennium", her collaboration with electronic producer Tarro, released in October 2016, was viewed over two million times on YouTube and streamed 1.4 million times on Spotify.

After Billboard premiered her single "Immortal" in December 2016, it gained 4.5 million streams on Spotify, while the video netted nearly a million views on YouTube. A remix by DJ duo Snakehips netted an additional 770,000 Spotify streams.

Her follow-up single "Fly", released in July 2017, featured production from ILLA and Cool & Dre (Christina Milian, Lil Wayne).

In July 2018, she collaborated with Russian-German music producer Zedd on the single "Happy Now".

On August 3, 2018, her collaborative single with Gryffin, "Tie Me Down", was released. On August 10, 2018, she released the EP Dragon Mentality. In 2021 she released "Kids of the Night". She also released "Bad Memories" with Meduza, James Carter and Fast Boy in 2022. In the same year, her 2020 single "Middle of the Night" achieved chart success after going viral on TikTok. That summer, she signed a "seven-figure artist funding deal" with beatBread to allow her to release more music independently with her label, Not Fit for Society.

Discography

Extended plays

Singles

As lead artist

As featured artist

Notes

References

Living people
1992 births
American women singer-songwriters
People from Jackson County, Mississippi
Singer-songwriters from Mississippi
21st-century American singers
21st-century American women singers
Singer-songwriters from Alabama